Élisabeth Baume-Schneider (born 24 December 1963) is a Swiss politician of the Social Democratic Party of Switzerland (SP) and a current member of the Federal Council. She was elected on 7 December 2022, the first ever elected member from the Canton of Jura.

Early life and education 
Élisabeth Baume-Schneider was born to farmers in Saint-Imier. Her grandparents come from Seeland in Canton Bern. She graduated from high school in La Chaux-de-Fonds in 1983 and following she studied social sciences at the University of Neuchâtel. She obtained a licentiate in 1987. Between 1989 and 2002 she worked as a social worker in Franches-Montagnes and later for the cantonal administration of Jura.

Political career 
In her early political career, she was influenced by the Polish Solidarnosc, her involvement at the Amnesty International and in the Socialist Workers Party, before she eventually joined the Social Democratic Party (SP). in 1995 she became a member of the Grand Council of Jura over which she presided in 2000. Between December 2002 and 2015 she was a member of the government of the Canton of Jura in which she acted as the minister of education culture and sports. As an Executive Councilor of Jura, she was involved in the negotiations in transferring Moutier from the majority German speaking Canton Berne to Jura which is a majority francophone canton. She also instituted the bilingual high school exam in the canton. 

In the federal elections of 2019, Baume-Schneider was elected to the Council of States. In January 2020 she was elected to the advisory council of the Fachhochschule. In November 2022, she announced her candidacy to the Federal Council of Switzerland.

Federal Councilor 
On the 7 December 2022, she was elected to the federal council, replacing the previous, retiring federal councillor for the SP, Simonetta Sommaruga. She is the first member of the federal council from the canton of Jura, the youngest of the Swiss cantons. Her election was controversial, as it means that the German-speaking part of Switzerland, which constitutes the majority of the Swiss population, is now underrepresented in the federal council, with only 3 of the 7 councillors hailing from this region. She was assigned to the Federal Departement of Justice and Police in succession of fellow Federal Councillor Karin Keller-Sutter who became the head of the Federal Department of Finance.

Personal life 
Elisabeth Baume-Schneider is married and has two children. Her place of origin is Les Breuleux, Jura, Switzerland where she owns some Blacknose sheep. She gave birth to her second child when she was presiding the Grand Council of Jura in 2000. She tried to create a family based work-life balance and attempted to reserve half a day per week while acting in the executive council of Jura. She then had to admit that this was not possible, and was grateful her partner reduced his work pensum to 50%.

References 

|-

Living people
University of Neuchâtel alumni
1963 births
21st-century Swiss women politicians
21st-century Swiss politicians
Members of the Council of States (Switzerland)
Members of the Federal Council (Switzerland)
Women members of the Federal Council (Switzerland)
Female justice ministers